John Bessant (11 November 1892 – 17 January 1982) was an English cricketer. He played for Gloucestershire between 1921 and 1928.

References

1892 births
1982 deaths
Gloucestershire cricketers
Cricketers from Bristol